Frederick Lablache  (29 August 1815 – 30 January 1887) was an English singer.  The eldest son of Luigi Lablache, vocalist, was educated by his father. He married and worked with the singer Fanny Wyndham. They both taught at the Academy of Music

Life 

About 1837 he appeared at the King's Theatre, London, in Italian opera, and afterwards frequently sang at Manchester with Italian singers such as Giovanni Matteo Mario, Giulia Grisi, and Favanti. In 1844 he took a part in Così fan tutte at Her Majesty's Theatre, and in 1846 in Il matrimonio segreto. He played the part of Count Rodolphe to Jenny Lind's Amina in La sonnambula on her first visit to Manchester on 28 August 1847 and he also appeared with her in other character roles under the management of Michael Balfe in 1849. About 1865 he withdrew from the stage, and taught at the Royal Academy of Music.

His wife, Fanny Wyndham Lablache, who died in 1877, was a vocalist, whose maiden name was Wilton, was born in Scotland.  She studied at the Royal Academy of Music in London between 1836–37 and then made her début at the Lyceum Theatre, afterwards also appearing at Her Majesty's Theatre. She was a serviceable vocalist and a teacher of much skill. After her marriage she retired from the stage, and died in Paris 23 September 1877.

He died at 51 Albany Street, London on 30 January 1887. Their son, Luigi Lablache, was an actor who died in 1914. He was the grandfather of the actor Stewart Granger.

References

External links
Portrait at the NPG London

1815 births
1887 deaths
19th-century British male opera singers
Operatic basses
Alumni of the Royal Academy of Music
Burials at Kensal Green Cemetery